The Age of Uncertainty is a 1977 book and television series about economics, co-produced by the BBC, CBC, KCET and OECA, and written and presented by Harvard economist John Kenneth Galbraith.

Background
Galbraith fully acknowledged the successes of the market system in economics but associated it with instability, inefficiency and social inequity. He advocated government policies and interventions to remedy these perceived faults. In his book Economics and the Public Purpose  (1973) he proposed the extension of the planning system used in the industrial core of the economy to the wider market economy. He argued for a new socialism, with more steeply progressive taxes, public housing, medical care and transportation, public support of the arts and the conversion of some corporations and military contractors into public corporations.

He was the most read social scientist of his era. Galbraith's association with the U.S. Democratic Party and his criticism of fellow economists, who promoted individualistic free-market economics that he perceived as a false social reality, occasioned strong responses. He was of the opinion that "Wealth is the relentless enemy of understanding".

In the midst of the Watergate scandal in the summer of 1973 Galbraith was called by Adrian Malone of the BBC and asked if he would be interested in doing a television series on the history of economic or social ideas. Galbraith had been thinking of retirement but quickly accepted Malone's proposal. At an early point they settled on the title "Age of Uncertainty" to reflect the sharp contrast between the great certainty in 19th century economic thought with the much less assured views in modern times.

As discussions about the series continued a further theme was developed: that what people believe about the workings of markets and their relationships to the state shapes history through the laws that are enacted or discarded. It was therefore decided that the treatment of these themes would loosely fall into two parts, ideas followed by their consequences.

Production
The content of the series was determined by Galbraith with the presentation style directed by his colleagues in the BBC. Galbraith began by writing a series of essays from which the scripts were derived and from these the book emerged which in many places goes beyond the material covered in the relevant television episode. The series was three years in the making.

Series outline
 The Prophets and Promise of Classical Capitalism
 The Manners and Morals of High Capitalism
 The Dissent of Karl Marx
 The Colonial Idea
 Lenin and the Great Ungluing
 The Rise and Fall of Money
 The Mandarin Revolution
 The Fatal Competition
 The Big Corporation
 Land and People
 The Metropolis
 Democracy, Leadership, Commitment
 Weekend in Vermont (three one-hour programmes in which Galbraith discusses economics, politics and international relations with guests such as Henry Kissinger, Georgy Arbatov and Edward Heath). These interviews are not covered in the book.

Reception
The leader of the British Conservative Party, Margaret Thatcher, and Keith Joseph objected to the screening of the series by the BBC as they perceived it too biased for a state-run TV station. Milton Friedman was brought over from Chicago to lecture against Galbraith's economic viewpoints with Nicholas Kaldor opposing him. The Daily Telegraph and The Spectator, publications associated with the Conservative political party, dismissed the series whilst the Financial Times and New York Times viewed it positively. Milton Friedman presented his own response to Galbraith in his series Free to Choose.

Along with his other works Economics and the Public Purse and Money, The Age of Uncertainty reinforced Galbraith's stature as a major American economist who upheld and championed traditional Keynesian economics as opposed to the more free market and liberal economic theories of Milton Friedman.

Editions
 The Age of Uncertainty, John Kenneth Galbraith, BBC – Andre Deutsch, 1977,

References 

 Angus Burgin, Age of Certainty: Galbraith, Friedman, and the Public Life of Economic Ideas. In: Tiago Mata/Steven G. Medema (eds.), The Economist as Public Intellectual (= History of Political Economy, annual supplement), Durham 2013, pp. 191–219

Notes

External links

1977 non-fiction books
1970s British documentary television series
British documentary films
British television documentaries
BBC television documentaries
Books by John Kenneth Galbraith